Île Longue (French for "Long Island") is a peninsula of the roadstead of Brest in the department of Finistère in the Brittany region. It is the base of the SNLE, the French ballistic missile submarines, and as such one of the most secretive and heavily defended places in France.

Geography
Île Longue is a peninsula on the commune of Crozon, attached to the Crozon peninsula. its altitude is 42 metres and has an area of 1.10 km2. To the north of the peninsula there are two small islands: Ile des Morts and Ile Trébéron.

Originally the isthmus was a mere sand bank, and crossing was only possible at low tide. During the 19th century, it was improved with a stone pathway. During the construction of the strategic base (1967–1972), it was widened, made insubmersible, and changed into a big parking space.

The peninsula is a stone plateau surrounded by cliffs. It harbours several water springs, which made human habitat possible. In the 19th century, three villages were built on the peninsula: Kernalleguen (less than a kilometre of the isthmus), Kermeur (1.5 km of the isthmus) and Bothuelc'h, slightly North.

History

Description of the peninsula in 1895

Quarries 
Exploitation of porphyry started in the 18th century. By the end of the 19th century, half a million cobblestones were produced each year. Up to eleven quarries were exploited around the peninsula. The largest, Vengleuz Braz, was located west from Kermeur.

Fortifications 
With its cliffs, local water resources, isthmus crossable only at low tide and its location defending Brest harbour, Île Longue is an easily defendable, strategic location.

 had a fort constructed at the top of the peninsula around 1776. It featured a hemicircular lower battery with small buildings protected by a ditch, with a bastion and a drawbridge.

In 1879, a wall was built South of the peninsula, as to defend it against the land. It featured a drawbridge defended by a 
casemate and two bastions. Remains of the main gate and of the casemate still exist, but are enclosed in the military area, and not accessible to the general public.

First World War 
From 1914 to 1919, Île Longue was used as an internment camp for German citizens captured after the seizure of the ship Nieuw Amsterdam, intercepted by the French 2nd Light Squadron on 2 September 1914.

From 3–23 September, the 1500 passengers were interned at Crozon fort and in Brest; from 4 November, they were transferred to a camp built on Île Longue for the occasion. The last prisoners were released on 31 December 1919.

Second World War 
During the occupation, the Germans used Île Longue as an anti-aircraft battery, which remained active until 1944. Megalithic monuments were destroyed by the construction of bunkers.

Île Longue strategic submarine base 

In 1965, President Charles de Gaulle chose Île Longue as home for the sea-based component of the Force de frappe. The place was chosen because it was close to a large harbour, yet distant enough to stay out of the public's eye, and was easily controlled and defended. Île Longue is the command center for France's SSBNs.

Work began in 1967 and took 5 years. The peninsula was completely changed, as the isthmus was widened and consolidated, and the peninsula itself gained 30 hectares. Two dry docks were built, as well as numerous habitation, engineering and defence buildings, and approximately 24 vertical missile silos. Missiles are assembled just south of the base, at the Guenvénez Missile Storage and Maintenance Area.

In 1972, the base was made operational and Le Redoutable departed for her first patrol. Île Longue has been the base of the SNLE of the Force Océanique Stratégique ever since.

Maintenance of the submarines is done at Île Longue, as well as storage of the nuclear components (warheads and fuel bars). Chemical pyrotechnics for the missiles and conventional warheads are stored in Guenvénez, 4 km away.

The base is divided into three colour-coded zones:
 Zone Blue comprises the security installations and personnel, including the fire department and the Fusiliers Marins responsible for the defence of the site. This zone also comprises offices and catering.
 Zone Red encompasses the pyrotechnics and bunkers to hold nuclear warheads.
 Zone Yellow encompasses the harbour and submarine installations, notably two roofed 200-metre long docks. A 170-metre long bunker between the two docks is used to load and unload nuclear materials.

Since 2006, work has been undertaken at Île Longue to prepare the base for the new M51 SLBM.

Controversy
In 2005, a controversy broke out when it was realised that this area is clearly visible from Google Earth. But since 2018, it is not possible anymore to view good quality satellite images of this sensitive area in most western map websites - but Russian mapping and search provider Yandex continues to provide high quality images. In addition, taking pictures from the surrounding coastline is banned by the authorities.

Notes and references

Bibliography
 Maël Prigent, Ile longue. Regards discrets, 2008

External links
 French Ministry of Defence
 Satellite photographs on Google Maps.

French Navy submarine bases
Geography of Brest, France